Metternichia is a monotypic genus of flowering plants belonging to the family Solanaceae. The only species is Metternichia principis .

It is native to eastern Brazil.

The genus name of Metternichia is in honour of Klemens von Metternich (1773–1859), diplomat and Austrian painter and illustrator. The Latin specific epithet of principis is derived from princeps meaning foremost.
Both the genus and species were first described and published by Johann Christian Mikan in Del. Fl. Faun. Bras. on table 13 in 1823.

References

Solanaceae
Monotypic Solanaceae genera
Plants described in 1823
Flora of Brazil